Björn Thorwaldson (born 8 October 1955 in Hölö) is a Swedish sport shooter. He competed at the Summer Olympics in 1988 and 1992. In 1988, he tied for 13th place in the mixed skeet event, and in 1992, he tied for 51st place in the mixed skeet event.

References

1955 births
Living people
Skeet shooters
Swedish male sport shooters
Shooters at the 1988 Summer Olympics
Shooters at the 1992 Summer Olympics
Olympic shooters of Sweden